Þorvaldur Makan Sigbjörnsson (born 26 November 1974) is an Icelandic former international footballer.

Club career
He played club football for KA Akureyri, Leiftur, Östers IF, KA Akureyri again, Fram Reykjavik and Valur.

In October and November 1997, Þorvaldur underwent a trial at Sheffield United and Stoke City but was not signed. In December, he had a trial with Östers IF and in January 1998, he signed a three-year contract with the club.

In December 1998, he signed with KA.

In June 2004, Þorvaldur collapsed during the middle of a game between Fram and Fylkir due to what was initially thought to be a severe migrane. In July 2004, he announced his retirement from football due to a brain injury caused by several blows to the head over his career. Two years later, he had recovered from the injury returned to the field with Valur.

National team career
Þorvaldur won one cap for the senior Iceland team, in a 6–1 friendly defeat to Brazil in Brasília on 8 March 2002.

Personal life
Þorvaldur's wife Katrín Jónsdóttir was the captain of the Iceland women's national football team. They were married in August 2009, just before Katrín played at UEFA Women's Euro 2009.

References

External links
 
 

Sigbjornsson, Thorvaldur
Sigbjornsson, Thorvaldur
Icelandic footballers
Knattspyrnufélag Akureyrar players
Sigbjornsson, Thorvaldur
Sigbjornsson, Thorvaldur
Sigbjornsson, Thorvaldur
Sigbjornsson, Thorvaldur
Iceland international footballers
Iceland youth international footballers
Icelandic expatriate footballers
Valur (men's football) players
Knattspyrnufélagið Fram players
Sigbjornsson, Thorvaldur